Visala Hrudayalu is a 1965 Indian Telugu-language drama film, produced by Donepudi Krishna Murthy and directed by B. S. Narayana. It stars N. T. Rama Rao and Krishna Kumari, with music composed by T. V. Raju. The film's title was earlier announced as Preminchi Pelli Chesuko before getting renamed. The movie is a remake of 1963 Kannada movie Mana Mecchida Madadi.

Plot 
Vishwanadham (Gummadi), after the death of his first wife, his father-in-law Bhadraiah (V. Nagayya), makes a second alliance for him in a rich family hiding the fact that he was already married and his son Shankaram (N. T. Rama Rao) is nurtured by his grandfather. Vishwanadham makes secret arrangements for Shankaram's higher education by keeping him in his friend Pattabhi's (Nagabhushanam) house. Pattabhi has two daughters, Parvathi (Krishna Kumari) and Indira (Chandrakala). Sharankaram and Parvathi fall in love, knowing this, Pattabhi necks Shankaram out of the house. Parvathi also leaves with him and they get married. Shankaram takes up a small job and they lead a happy family life. Time passes, they are blessed with a baby boy and Bhadraiah passes away. Meanwhile, Indira's marriage fixes up with Vishwanatham's second son Manohar (Chalam) for which Parvathi and Shankaram are also invited by her mother Janakamma (Hemalatha) and they attend the function, where Pattabhi insults the couple very badly and also blames a theft on them. The couple leaves the house, keeping the oath that they are not entering their house anymore. Due to the insult that happened to Parvathi, Janakamma becomes sick. Simultaneously, Pattabhi's entire property is bankrupted and the doctor says the only way to protect Janakamma is to bring Parvathi. Now Pattabhi realizes his mistake and understands relations are greater than property. So, he apologizes to Shankaram and Parvathi and gets them back. At last, Vishwanadham also reveals that Shankaram is his elder son. Finally, the movie ends on a happy note with the reunion of the entire family.

Cast 
N. T. Rama Rao as Shankar
Krishna Kumari as Parvathi
V. Nagayya as Bhadraiah
Relangi as Ramadasu
Gummadi as Viswanatham
Nagabhushanam as Pattabhi
Chalam as Manohar
Chadalavada
Girija as Shanta
Hemalatha as Janakamma
Chandrakala as Indira
Radha Kumari

Soundtrack 

Music composed by T. V. Raju.

References

External links 
 

1965 drama films
1965 films
Films scored by T. V. Raju
Indian drama films
Telugu remakes of Kannada films